Rii may refer to:
Rii Sen, Bengali actress
Relative index of inequality or RII

See also 
 Riis